Delaplaine School District was a school district headquartered in Delaplaine, Arkansas. It served Delaplaine and O'Kean.

It was administratively divided between an elementary school (Delaplaine Elementary School) and a high school (Delaplaine High School). Until 1962 it had an elementary school in O'Kean.

History
In 1948 the Delaplaine District absorbed the O'Kean district, including the elementary school, and O'Kean High School closed. In 1962 O'Kean Elementary School was shuttered.

By 2004 new laws were passed requiring school districts with enrollments below 350 to consolidate with other school districts. Delaplaine was one of several districts that were unable to find another district willing to consolidate with it, so the Arkansas Board of Education was to forcibly consolidate it. On July 1, 2004, it consolidated into the Greene County Tech School District.

References

Further reading
Maps indicating the Delaplaine District:
 Map of Arkansas School Districts pre-July 1, 2004
 (Download)
 (Download)

External links
 

Defunct school districts in Arkansas
Education in Greene County, Arkansas
Education in Randolph County, Arkansas
2004 disestablishments in Arkansas
School districts disestablished in 2004